Bromoviridae is a family of viruses. Plants serve as natural hosts. There are six genera in the family.

Taxonomy
The following genera are assigned to the family:
 Alfamovirus
 Anulavirus
 Bromovirus
 Cucumovirus
 Ilarvirus
 Oleavirus

Structure
Viruses in the family Bromoviridae are non-enveloped, with icosahedral and bacilliform geometries. The diameter is around 26-35 nm.

Genomes are linear and segmented, tripartite.

Life cycle
Viral replication is cytoplasmic, and is lysogenic. Entry into the host cell is achieved by penetration into the host cell. Replication follows the positive stranded RNA virus replication model. Positive stranded rna virus transcription, using the internal initiation model of subgenomic rna transcription is the method of transcription. The virus exits the host cell by tubule-guided viral movement. Plants serve as the natural host. Transmission routes are mechanical and contact.

References

External links

 ICTV Report: Bromoviridae
 Viralzone: Bromoviridae

 
Virus families
Riboviria